Rubrograptis recrudescentia is a species of moth of the family Tortricidae. It is found in Nigeria and Benin.

The length of the forewings is 4–5 mm. The ground colour of the forewings is dark grey with a bluish-green hue. The costal and distal pattern is orange, spotted with brown. There is also a red pattern, The hindwings are brown-grey.

References

Moths described in 1981
Tortricini